Bokaa is a village in Kgatleng District of Botswana. The village is located around 20 km south-west of Mochudi and the population was 5,765 in 2011 census.
The village is just north of the Bokaa Dam.

References

Kgatleng District
Villages in Botswana